Hong Kong Society for the Protection of Children (HKSPC) is a registered charity partially subvented by the government. With no support from the Community Chest, it relies on direct donations and fundraising among the community. All donations are tax exempt.

In 27 centres across Hong Kong Island, Kowloon and the New Territories, HKSPC cares for children from newborn to 16-year-olds providing a stimulating environment in which to educate them and nurture their growth and development, and to educate parents on age appropriate parenting.

Services 
HKSPC operates 27 service units throughout Hong Kong serving around 3,000 children and their families on a daily basis.

Nursery schools and day crèches
HKSPC operates five-day crèches (for infants to 2-year-olds) and 17 nursery schools (for children aged 2 to 6 years old) to take care of more than 2,500 children throughout the SAR. Many of these children come from less privileged and/or families with acute social problems.

 Ocean Shores Nursery School also provides day creche service

Children and family services
The Children & Family Services Centre (MTC) offers services to the community to enhance and strengthen families with children from 0 to 16 years old, recipients include low-income families, single parent families, CSSA recipients, new arrivals and ethnic minority groups. In 2008, Children & Family Services Projects was launched at the headquarters in Mongkok, with the aims to provide supports to needy families including cross-border marriages, new immigrants and single parents, who live in deplorable conditions.

Residential care for babies and young children
The Children's Residential Home provides 24-hour care for children below 3 years old who are abandoned by their parents, referred to HKSPC by court order or from parents who cannot give them appropriate or adequate care because of drug addiction, mental illness or domestic violence etc.

After-school care
HKSPC offers daily after-school care, academic and social guidance to children from Primary 1 through Primary 6 while their parents are both at work. It also provides half- and full-day summer classes to enhance children's cognitive and social development.

IT Education Centre
Children from different service units can visit this tailor-made centre on a roster schedule, providing stimulating environment to introduce them to modern technology at a young age.

References

Educational organisations based in Hong Kong
Children's charities based in Hong Kong